I'm Bout It is a 1997 American drama comedy film by rapper Master P. The film stars Master P, Moon Jones, Anthony Boswell, Silkk the Shocker, Mack 10, C-Murder, Mia X and Mr. Serv-On.

Plot
The movie chronicles New Orleans through the eyes of Master P growing up in the notorious Calliope Projects. His brother Kevin Miller played by Anthony Boswell. Master P wrote, directed and acted in the film. The movie itself was a huge success for No Limit Records and No Limit Films. It was an independent release.

Release
The film was released directly to video.

See also
 I'm Bout It (soundtrack)
 List of hood films

References

External links
 
 

American independent films
1997 direct-to-video films
1997 films
American coming-of-age comedy-drama films
1990s coming-of-age comedy-drama films
1997 comedy films
1997 drama films
Films directed by Master P
1990s English-language films
1990s American films